In mathematics, Raynaud's isogeny theorem, proved by , relates the Faltings heights of two isogeneous elliptic curves.

References

Elliptic curves
Theorems in algebraic geometry